Penny Lake is a lake in the U.S. state of Wisconsin.

According to tradition, Penny Lake was named after the dog owned by the proprietor of a lakeside resort.

References

Lakes of Wisconsin
Bodies of water of Portage County, Wisconsin